The Nicobi Lake is a freshwater body of the southern part of Eeyou Istchee James Bay (municipality), in the administrative region of Nord-du-Québec, in the province of Quebec, in Canada.

Forestry is the main economic activity of the sector. Further south, thanks to the creation of the Wetetnagami Lake Protected Biodiversity Reserve, recreational and tourism activities have been highlighted.

Its surface is generally frozen from the beginning of December to the end of April.

Geography

Toponymy
The explorer Henry O'Sullivan, having traveled this area between 1897 and 1899, indicated on his map of 1900 L. Nicobi to describe the widening of a segment of watercourse. At the same latitude, 125 km further east, we find Lake Nicabau, located northwest of the Ashuapmushuan Wildlife Sanctuary. In the Innu language, Nicobi, like Nicabau (nekupau), would mean "lake with spikes of hay or woods of alders".

The toponym "Lake Nicobi" was formalized on December 5, 1968, by the Commission de toponymie du Québec when it was created.

Notes and references

See also 

Lakes of Nord-du-Québec
Eeyou Istchee James Bay
Nottaway River drainage basin